The 2010 Austin Peay Governors football team represented Austin Peay State University as a member of the Ohio Valley Conference (OVC) during the 2010 NCAA Division I FCS football season. The Governors were led by fourth-year head coach Rick Christophel and played their home games at Governors Stadium. They finished the season with an overall record of 2–9 and a mark of 1–7 in conference play, placing eighth in the OVC.

Schedule

Coaching staff

References

Austin Peay
Austin Peay Governors football seasons
Austin Peay Governors football